Kanoa Igarashi (born October 1, 1997) is a Japanese American surfer who has competed professionally worldwide since 2012.  In 2016, he was the youngest rookie on the World Surf League (WSL) Championship Tour (CT), and had collected more Round One wins than any other surfer, finished 2nd place at the Pipeline event, and 20th place overall that year.  His greatest career performance was in the 2022 WSL CT where he finished top 5 and got to compete on the final event of the year held in Trestles California.

Childhood 
Igarashi's father Tsutomu was a surfer in Japan and an avid fan of the sport himself.  When his wife Misa found out she was pregnant, the couple quit their jobs in Tokyo and moved to Huntington Beach, California, aka Surf City, with the goal of raising their child to be a competitive surfer.  Tsutomu took his son surfing as young as age 3, and would routinely wake him up to go surfing by 5:45AM so he could still make it to school on time.  Igarashi won his first surfing trophy by age 7.

Career 
In 2016 he entered as the youngest rookie to the WSL CT and the first representative surfer for Japan in the WSL.  He won the Vans U.S. Open WSL event in his hometown of Huntington Beach two years in a row in 2017 and 2018, but was eliminated early the following year.  Igarashi's first 1st-place finish at a WSL CT event was at the Corona Bali Protected event in Indonesia in 2019; he placed 6th overall that year.

As a top ranked finisher of the 2019 WSL CT, Igarashi qualified to compete in the 2020 Summer Olympic Games in Tokyo as a representative of Japan.  The games were postponed to July 23, 2021, due to the 2019 coronavirus outbreak.  The selected beach break for the competition was at Tsurigasaki beach in the town of Ichinomiya, Chiba prefecture.  The chosen beach had special meaning to Igarashi as it was the same beach that his father Tsutomu not only surfed at, but also reportedly discovered with his friends and called "the Dojo". Igarashi won the silver medal in the competition. 

Igarashi is a Red Bull Athlete.

References 

American surfers
Japanese surfers
World Surf League surfers
1997 births
Living people
Sportspeople from Huntington Beach, California
Olympic surfers of Japan
Surfers at the 2020 Summer Olympics
American sportspeople of Japanese descent
Olympic silver medalists for Japan
Medalists at the 2020 Summer Olympics
Olympic medalists in surfing